Shahjahanpur Assembly constituency is one of the 403 constituencies of the Uttar Pradesh Legislative Assembly, India. It is a part of the Shahjahanpur district and one of the five assembly constituencies in the Shahjahanpur Lok Sabha constituency. First election in this assembly constituency was held in 1952 after the "DPACO (1951)" (delimitation order) was passed in 1951. After the "Delimitation of Parliamentary and Assembly Constituencies Order" was passed in 2008, the constituency was assigned identification number 135.

Wards / Areas
Extent of Shahjahanpur Assembly constituency is KC Nagar, Shahjahanpur CB, Shahjahanpur (MB+OG) & Rly. Settlement Roza NP of Shahjahanpur Tehsil.

Members of the Legislative Assembly

Election results

2022

2017

See also

Shahjahanpur district
Shahjahanpur Lok Sabha constituency
Sixteenth Legislative Assembly of Uttar Pradesh
Uttar Pradesh Legislative Assembly
Vidhan Bhawan

References

External links
 

Assembly constituencies of Uttar Pradesh
Shahjahanpur
Constituencies established in 1951